Ling may refer to:

Fictional characters
 Ling, an ally of James Bond's from the film You Only Live Twice
 Ling, a fictional character from the Mulan series
 Ling, a playable character from the mobile game Mobile Legends: Bang Bang
 Ling Bouvier, a fictional character from The Simpsons
 Ling Woo, a fictional character from Ally McBeal
 Ling Xiaoyu, a fictional character from the Tekken series
 Ling Yao, a character from the manga series Fullmetal Alchemist and its 2009 anime adaption Fullmetal Alchemist: Brotherhood
 Bàba, Māma, and Gwen Ling, characters from American Dad!

Fish 
 Atlantic cod, formerly called ling when salted
 Blue ling (Molva dypterygia)
 Burbot (Lota lota) or freshwater ling
 Cobia (Rachycentron canadum)
 Common ling (Molva molva)
 Pink cusk-eel (Genypterus blacodes), pink ling or northern ling

Plants
 Calluna, a flowering plant in the heather family
 Water caltrop or ling nut

Religion
 Ling (Chinese religion), the notion of the sacred in Chinese religions
 Lingam or ling, a representation of the Hindu deity Shiva

Other uses
 Ling (surname), a surname of various origins

See also
 
 -ling, an English diminutive suffix
 Ling-Ling (disambiguation)
 Gesar of Ling, mythical Tibetan culture-hero
 Linga (disambiguation)
 Linh (Vietnamese religion), is the notion of the sacred in Vietnamese religions, and the Vietnamese pronunciation of the Chinese character 
 Linh, a Vietnamese surname